The Port of Morrow is the port authority in Boardman, a city in Morrow County, Oregon, United States, on the Columbia River.

History 
In 1958, Morrow County residents approved the creation of a port district by general election. A $500 loan was the humble beginning to what has become the second largest port in Oregon.

The first several years were spent establishing goals, objectives, policies, and organizing the Port. Beginning in 1963, the Port started acquiring industrial and harbor land, working with U.S. Corps of Engineers, local landowners, and the State of Oregon. The members of the first Port Commission were George Weise from Boardman (chairman), Dewey West from Boardman, Garland Swanson from Ione, Al Lamb from Heppner, and Warren McCoy from Irrigon.

In the late 1960s, the first Port tenants began to arrive. A food processing industrial park was created in 1973 and was home to the Docken Bean Plant, Morrow County Produce Co., Desert Magic, and Gourmet Foods.

In 1981, the Kinzua Corporation and Longview Fiber constructed a dock for a wood chip reload facility. Sung Kiong Farms (SK Farms) built the grain terminal in 1983 to ship corn from Oregon and the Midwest to Pacific Rim countries. Also in 1983, a new freeway interchange was created to alleviate heavy traffic in Boardman, particularly during the potato harvest season. The new interchange provided easy access to the Boardman Industrial Park. In the mid 1980s, container activity began. The Tidewater Terminal is the largest container terminal upriver of the Port of Portland.

The Port of Morrow has seen steady growth since the 1980s and industry within the Port is diverse. The PGE Coyote Springs/Avista cogeneration power plant provides efficient electricity and steam to Port businesses. In addition to food processing, the Port is home to agricultural industries, data centers, shipping companies, warehouse facilities, and energy businesses. Corporations who call the Port of Morrow home include Lamb-Weston, Boardman Foods, Tillamook Cheese, Cascade Specialties, Inc. (Farm Fresh/Jain), Tidewater, Barenbrug USA, Oregon Hay Company, Boardman Chip Company, Morrow County Grain Growers, Port of Morrow Warehouse, LTI, Inc., American Rock, Cadman Sand and Gravel, Zeachem, and Pacific Ethanol.

In 2022, the Oregon Department of Environmental Quality fined the Port of Morrow over $2.1 million dollars, the second largest fine ever the Department of Environmental Quality has ever levied. The civil penalty notice shows the port failed to comply with the conditions of its wastewater permit intended to protect groundwater from nitrate contamination. Morrow County has declared a local state of emergency as a result of nitrogen-rich wastewater being over-applied onto agricultural fields.

SAGE Center 
The SAGE (Sustainable AGriculture and Energy) Center is an interactive museum and visitor center constructed in 2013. It serves as an official Oregon Welcome Center that highlights sustainable agriculture and energy industries in the mid-Columbia Gorge region served by the Port of Morrow. The center provides hands-on exhibits that feature innovative technologies used by local industries and farmers to demonstrate how food gets from the farm to dinner tables around the world. Visitors can browse exhibits, enjoy Tillamook Ice Cream, and browse the gift shop for locally crafted merchandise. The SAGE Center offers free educational visits for schools.

Further reading
Ellis, David V. An archaeological assessment of the Port of Morrow's proposed barge-handling facility, Boardman, Oregon, Archaeological Investigations Northwest, 1992 
Port of Morrow turning basin, US Army Corps of Engineers, Portland District, 1999

References

External links
Port of Morrow Website
 Visit the SAGE Center

Morrow, Port of
Columbia River
Transportation in Morrow County, Oregon